Al-Rawdhah Club  is a Saudi Arabian football (soccer) team in Al-Jeshah playing at the Saudi Second Division.

Honours
Saudi First Division League
Runners-up (2): 1980–81, 1987–88

Stadium
Currently the team plays at the 20000 capacity Prince Abdullah bin Jalawi Stadium.

Current squad 

As of Saudi Second Division:

Notable players
Jassem Al-Hamdan
Ahmed Al-Nadhri
Hussain Al-Showaish

References

Football clubs in Saudi Arabia
1976 establishments in Saudi Arabia
Association football clubs established in 1976
Football clubs in Al-Ahsa Governorate